Schröder–Bernstein may refer to:

the Schröder–Bernstein theorem in set theory
Schröder–Bernstein theorem for measurable spaces
Schröder–Bernstein theorems for operator algebras
Schröder–Bernstein property